Barrett Township is a township in Monroe County, Pennsylvania, United States. The population was 4,053 at the 2020 census. Two Poconos resort communities, Buck Hill Falls and Skytop, are located within the township. It is located 38 miles from Scranton and 48 miles from Wilkes-Barre. There is one privately owned, public-use airport in Barrett Township, called the Flying Dollar Airport.

Geography

Demographics

As of the census of 2010, there were 4,225 people, 2,529 households, and 1,839 families residing in the township. The racial makeup of the township was 91.4% White, 3.9% African American, 0.1% Native American, 0.9% Asian, 1.6% from other races, and 1.9% from two or more races. Hispanic or Latino of any race were 5.2% of the population.

There were 2,529 households, out of which 27% had children under the age of 18 living with them, 48.5% were married couples living together, 8.6% had a female householder with no husband present, and 39.3% were non-families. 28.7% of all households were made up of individuals, and 13.9% had someone living alone who was 65 years of age or older. The average household size was 2.3 and the average family size was 2.9.

In the township the population was spread out, with 20.2% under the age of 18, 6.6% from 18 to 24, 27.4% from 25 to 44, 26.1% from 45 to 64, and 16.0% who were 65 years of age or older. The median age was 45.8 years. For every 100 females, there were 98.8 males. For every 100 females age 18 and over, there were 94.3 males.

The median income for a household in the township was $54,332, and the median income for a family was $59,230. Males had a median income of $37,291 versus $33,474 for females. The per capita income for the township was $27,157. About 7.2% of families and 9.4% of the population were below the poverty line, including 12.4% of those under age 18 and 4.2% of those age 65 or over.

Climate

According to the Trewartha climate classification system, Barrett Township has a Temperate Continental climate (Dc) with warm summers (b), cold winters (o) and year-around precipitation (Dcbo). Dcbo climates are characterized by at least one month having an average mean temperature ≤ , four to seven months with an average mean temperature ≥ , all months with an average mean temperature <  and no significant precipitation difference between seasons. Although most summer days are comfortably humid in Barrett Township, episodes of heat and high humidity can occur with heat index values > . July is the peak month for thunderstorm activity, which correlates with the average warmest month of the year. The average wettest month is September, which correlates with tropical storm remnants during the peak of the Atlantic hurricane season. Since 1981, the wettest calendar day has been  on September 30, 2010. Since 1981, the coldest air temperature has been  on January 21, 1994. Episodes of extreme cold and wind can occur, with wind chill values < . The average snowiest month is January which, correlates with the average coldest month of the year. Ice storms and large snowstorms depositing ≥  of snow occur once every couple of years, particularly during nor’easters from December through March.

Transportation

Pennsylvania Route 191, Pennsylvania Route 390 and Pennsylvania Route 447 are the numbered highways serving Barrett Township. PA 191 follows a southeast-northwest alignment across southern and western portions of the township. PA 390 follows a southwest-northeast alignment across the middle of the township, including a concurrency with PA 191. Finally, PA 447 follows a southeast-northwest alignment through the center of the township.

Ecology

According to the A. W. Kuchler U.S. potential natural vegetation types, Barrett Township would have a dominant vegetation type of Appalachian Oak (104) with a dominant vegetation form of Eastern Hardwood Forest (25). The peak spring bloom typically occurs in late-April and peak fall color usually occurs in mid-October.

References

External links

Barrett Township Official Site
Barrett Township Archived Site
Barrett Township Community Portal

Pocono Mountains
Populated places established in 1764
Townships in Monroe County, Pennsylvania
Townships in Pennsylvania
1764 establishments in Pennsylvania